The Wietenberg culture was a Middle Bronze Age archeological culture in central Romania (Transylvania) that roughly dates to 2200–1600/1500 BCE. Represented a local variant of Usatove culture, was contemporary with the Ottomány culture and Unetice culture and was replaced by the Noua culture. Its name was coined after the eponymic Wietenberg Hill near Sighișoara.

People of this culture traded with the Mycenaeans. Burial sites contain bronze battle axes and maces with stone heads. Pottery consists of amphorae with spiral and meandric ornament.

By 1964, about 200 settlements of this culture were discovered.

Gallery

See also
 Bronze Age in Romania
 Ottomány culture
 Monteoru culture
 Tei culture
 Vatya culture
 Basarabi culture
 Coțofeni culture
 Pecica culture
 Prehistory of Transylvania
 Prehistoric Romania
 Prehistoric Europe
 Bronze Age Europe
 Rotbav Archaeological Site

Notes

References 
Wietenberg ohne Mykene. Gedanken zu Herkunft und Bedeutung der Keramikverzierung der Wietenberg-Kultur von Laura Dietrich und Oliver Dietrich, Berlin (2011)

External links 

 Golden axe of Tufalau
 Культура витенберг
 Бронзовый век
 Wietenberg pottery

Archaeological cultures in Romania
Bronze Age cultures of Europe
Archaeological cultures of Central Europe
Archaeology of Southeastern Europe